William Manondo (born 2 April 1991) is a Zimbabwean footballer who plays as a forward for CAPS United and the Zimbabwe national team.

Playing career

Club
Manondo started his career with Zimbabwe Premier Soccer League side Platinum, during his time with Platinum he was sent out on loan to Gunners in 2012 before being recalled in July of the same year. He spent one more year with Platinum after returning from his loan spell until he departed in 2013 to join Harare City.

Nicknamed Mr. Chibuku, he joined CAPS United in January 2022 after his contract with Harare City expired.

International
In 2016, Madondo made his debut for the Zimbabwe national team against Mali in a 2016 African Nations Championship match, one that ended in defeat for Zimbabwe. He played in Zimbabwe's final group fixture against Uganda and scored his first international goal in a 1–1 draw.

Career statistics

International
.

International goals
. Scores and results list Zimbabwe's goal tally first.

Honours

Club
Platinum
 Zimbabwean Independence Trophy (1): 2012

References

External links
 
 

1991 births
Living people
Association football forwards
Zimbabwean footballers
Zimbabwe international footballers
Kiglon F.C. players
F.C. Platinum players
Gunners F.C. players
Harare City F.C. players
CAPS United players
Zimbabwe A' international footballers
2016 African Nations Championship players